Bertamiráns Fútbol Club is a Spanish football club based in Bertamiráns, Ames, A Coruña. Founded in 1934, the team currently plays in Tercera División – Group 1. The club's home ground is Municipal.

Recent seasons

2 seasons in Tercera División

References

External links
Official website
Futbolme.com profile

Football clubs in Galicia (Spain)
Association football clubs established in 1934
1934 establishments in Spain